The City Bride; Or, The Merry Cuckold is a 1696 comedy play by the English writer Joseph Harris. It premiered at the Lincoln's Inn Fields Theatre, staged by Thomas Betterton's company. The plot was inspired by John Fletcher's A Cure for a Cuckold.

The original Lincoln's Inn Fields cast included John Bowman as Bonvile, John Thurmond as Friendly, George Bright as Justice Merryman, Samuel Bailey as  Mr Spruce, John Freeman as Compasse, Elizabeth Bowman as Arabella, Elizabeth Boutell as Clara and Abigail Lawson as Nurse.

References

Bibliography
 Van Lennep, W. The London Stage, 1660-1800: Volume One, 1660-1700. Southern Illinois University Press, 1960.

1696 plays
West End plays
Comedy plays
Plays by Joseph Harris
Plays set in London